Joseph Nunzio Latino (October 21, 1937 – May 28, 2021) was a bishop of the Catholic Church in the United States.  He served as bishop of the Diocese of Jackson in Mississippi from 2003 to 2013.

Early life and career 
Joseph Latino was born on October 21, 1937, in New Orleans, Louisiana.  He attended St. Joseph Seminary College in Covington, Louisiana, and Notre Dame Seminary in New Orleans. 

Latino was ordained to the priesthood for the Archdiocese of New Orleans by then Archbishop John Cody on May 25, 1963.  After his ordination, Latino served as an associate pastor at the Cathedral of St. Francis de Sales in Houma, Louisiana. He was assigned to St. John Prep Seminary in New Orleans as a teacher and spiritual director, serving there from 1968 to 1969. From 1969 to 1971, Latino was assigned to St. Philip the Apostle Parish in the Desire Project in New Orleans.  He served as pastor of St. Bernadette Parish in Houma, Louisiana (1972–1987), at which time he was appointed rector of St. Francis de Sales Cathedral. 

In 1977, Latino was incardinated, or transferred to the Diocese of Houma-Thibodaux. During the intervening years, he served as vocation director for the Diocese and was named a prelate of honor in January 1983.  He was appointed as vicar general and chancellor of the diocese.  After Bishop Michael Jarrell left the diocese, Latino was elected by the consultors to be the apostolic administrator

Episcopal career
Latino was appointed by Pope John Paul II to be the 10th bishop of the Diocese of Jackson on January 3, 2003.  He was consecrated by Archbishop Oscar Lipscomb on March 7, 2003.

Pope Francis accepted the resignation of Latino as bishop of Jackson on December 12, 2013. Joseph Latino died on May 28, 2021, in Jackson, Mississippi.

Coat of arms

Overview
The episcopal heraldic achievement, of bishop's coat of arms, is composed of a shield, with its charges (symbols), a motto scroll and the external ornaments.  The shield, which is the central most important feature of any heraldic device, is described (blazoned) in archaic 12th century terms, and this description is oriented as if being given by the bearer with the shield worn on the arm.: the terms dexter and sinister are thus the reverse of what they are as seen from the front.

Arms
By heraldic tradition, the arms of the bishop of a diocese, called the "Ordinary" are joined to the arms of his jurisdiction, seen in the dexter impalement (left side) of the shield.  In this case, these arms of the Diocese of Jackson.  These arms are composed of a golden (yellow) field on which is displayed a red cross "potent."  When the City of Jackson was established the second See City for the Diocese of Natchez-Jackson in 1957, the cross that had been used in the arms of Natchez was incorporated into the new design.  In 1977 when the diocese was renamed for the new, singular See City of Jackson the cross with a cross arm on each arm was retained to reflect the heritage of The Faith in this portion of the State of Mississippi.  Below the cross are wavy blue and silver (white) bars to represent the waters of the Mississippi.  For his personal arms, seen in the sinister impalement (right side) of the shield, Bishop Latino adopted a design reflecting his life as a priest of the Diocese of Houma-Thibodaux.  The design is a saltire with gold and red vertical bars on the top and bottom and silver fields on either side, the ancient arms of the Kingdom of Sicily, to reflect Bishop Latino's Sicilian heritage.  In the silver fields on either side of the design the black displayed eagles of the Sicilian arms have been replaced by a blue fleur-de-lis and a blue magnolia blossom to reflect Latino's birthplace of New Orleans and the surrounding region.  In the base of the gold bars from the upper portion have been replaced by a golden carpenter's square, issuant from the sides, to honor the bishop's Baptismal patron, St. Joseph. This arrangement is used in the arms of the Diocese of Houma-Thibodaux where Bishop Latino was serving as Vicar General when he became Bishop of Jackson.

Motto
Bishop Latino's motto was "ut unum sini" ("That all may be one)", from St. John's Gospel (John 17:11).

External
The device is completed with the external ornaments which are the processional cross, which is placed in back of the shield and which extends above and below the shield, and a pontifical hat, called a "galero", with its six tassels, in three rows, on either side of the shield, all green.  These are the heraldic insignia of the prelate of the rank of bishop by instruction of The Holy See of March 31, 1969.

See also
 

 Catholic Church hierarchy
 Catholic Church in the United States
 Historical list of the Catholic bishops of the United States
 List of Catholic bishops of the United States
 Lists of patriarchs, archbishops, and bishops

References

External links
 Roman Catholic Diocese of Jackson

Episcopal succession

Latino, Joseph N.
2021 deaths
Latino, Joseph N.
Notre Dame Seminary alumni
People from New Orleans
Catholics from Louisiana